Series 10 of Top Gear, a British motoring magazine and factual television programme, was broadcast in the United Kingdom on BBC Two during 2007, consisting of ten episodes that were aired between 7 October and 23 December. This series saw the props used on the programme being changed from car-based seating and a wide-screen monitor in the main set space, to wingback chairs and an old TV screen; although attributed to a fire caused by Top Gears rival programme, it later was exposed as a publicity stunt, with the props replaced the following series. This series' highlights included the presenters crossing Botswana on a road trip, a race between a car and a fighter jet, fording amphibious cars across the English Channel, and competing in a 24-hour endurance race using home-made bio-diesel.

A series of compilation episodes featuring the best moments of the tenth series, titled "Best of Top Gear", was aired during 2008 between 1-27 January, while a special edition for Sport Relief, titled Top Ground Gear Force, involving a crossover with the former BBC programme Ground Force, was aired on 14 March 2008. The tenth series received criticism for its Botswana special in regards to environmental damage, which the BBC denied.

Episodes

Best-of episodes

Spin-off special

Criticism and incident

Botswana Special: Makgadikgadi Pan Crossing
Following the broadcast of the Botswana Special, the BBC received heavy criticism from the Environmental Investigation Agency and conservationists in regards to a section of the episode, in which the presenters were tasked with driving their used cars across the Makgadikgadi Pan in Botswana. A spokesperson from the agency criticised Top Gear being allowed to film in environmentally sensitive salt pans, with an accusation made by conservationists that they had left "scars across the Makgadikgadi salt pans by driving vehicles across them". In response to the criticism, the BBC denied that they had done this, stating that they had followed the advice of environmental experts and had not filmed anywhere near to any conservation area on the salt pans.

Burnt props stunt
During the premiere episode of the series, the presenters of Top Gear claimed that, between the filming of the ninth and tenth series, rival motoring magazine show Fifth Gear had broken into their premises and burnt down all their props. Prior to the episode being aired, a fire occurred on 12 August 2007 at Hill End Farm, destroying a barn being used as a storage facility for Top Gear props. This was evidently shown to be the case on the episode, as the Cool Wall and all the cars' photos for it had been destroyed, while the car seats the hosts used on the centre stage for the 'News' segments and for interviewing the celebrities during the 'Star in a Reasonably Priced Car' segments on the centre stage of the studio, along with the flat screen monitor, had been replaced with wingback chairs and an old TV. It was later revealed that the incident had been a publicity stunt dreamt up between Clarkson and Vicki Butler-Henderson, who were old friends.

References

2007 British television seasons
Top Gear seasons